V. K. Agarwal is an Indian law scholar and academic administrator. He was vice-chancellor at Jagan Nath University, Jaipur and later pro-chancellor of the university.

Education 
Agarwal obtained his B.Sc.1972; LL.B. in 1975 and LL.M. in 1977 from the University of Delhi. He obtained his Doctorate in Law from Kurukshetra University.

Career 
Agarwal joined the Kurukshetra University Law department in 1978. He was appointed Reader( Associate Professor)in 1987 and Professor in 1994. He has served in various positions including Dean Faculty of Law; chairperson, Department of Law; Dean Academic Affairs and  Registrar of Kurukshetra  University. He later served as vice-chancellor of Jagan Nath University, Jaipur. He is currently Pro Chancellor of Jagannath University.

Research papers & books
 Consumer Protection - Law and Practice (8th Edition 2021). New Delhi: Bharat Law House. .

References

Living people
Place of birth missing (living people)
1950 births
20th-century Indian educational theorists
20th-century Indian educators
Scholars from Haryana
Heads of universities and colleges in India